Vanessa Ray Liptak (born June 24, 1981) is an American actress. She is known for her role on Pretty Little Liars as Charlotte Drake; and also for her roles as Jenny on the legal drama series Suits, Teri Ciccone on the soap opera As the World Turns, Officer Edit "Eddie" Janko-Reagan on long-running family-police drama Blue Bloods, and Maggie "Rocker" Sheldon on White Collar.

Acting career 
Ray earned her Actors' Equity Association card while performing the role of Rusty and singing "Let's Hear It For the Boy" in the musical Footloose. She played the role of Nemo in Robert and Kristin Lopez's Finding Nemo: The Musical at Orlando's Disney World. Ray played the character Olive Ostrovsky in the national tour of The 25th Annual Putnam County Spelling Bee. She joined the Broadway cast of Hair in its final year as Crissy, and sang the song "Frank Mills". She made her on-screen debut as Chris in the youth-oriented video short feature The Sparky Chronicles: The Map. (2003)

Between 2012 and 2017, Ray appeared as CeCe Drake, a "beyond-charismatic twenty-something blonde stylist at a boutique that has one heel in the present, one in the past", in the television series Pretty Little Liars. Ray was announced to start filming again for PLL, and spoke about returning, saying, "It's so fun to do, and what a crazy character I get to play. She's sort of a sociopath. I think she's so weird because she's, like, 22 but hangs out with high-schoolers. It's like, 'Hey, girl! Get a life!'”

In 2013, Ray joined the Season 4 cast of the CBS police procedural drama Blue Bloods as Officer Edit "Eddie" Janko, a role she has continued throughout the show's run.

Personal life 
Ray now lives and works between Los Angeles and New York City. She married actor Derek James Baynham on January 8, 2003. In 2007, the first season of the HGTV series Marriage Under Construction covered their purchase, renovation and eventual sale of a house in Toronto. The couple divorced in 2009. 
In March 2015, Ray announced on Instagram and Twitter that she was engaged to her boyfriend of six years, Landon Beard. On June 14, 2015, they married at the Condor's Nest Ranch in eastern San Diego County, California.

Filmography

Film

Television

Awards and nominations

References

External links 
 

Living people
Actresses from Washington (state)
People from Livermore, California
American television actresses
Place of birth missing (living people)
American film actresses
Actresses from New York City
1981 births
21st-century American actresses
People from Vancouver, Washington